Animal Planet Report is a reality television series about reports on animals all over the United States. The series aired on Animal Planet and was hosted by Michelle Beadle.

References

External links

2000s American documentary television series
Animal Planet original programming
2006 American television series debuts
2007 American television series endings